Sivalenka Krishna Prasad is an Indian film producer.

Earlier Life
Sivalenka Krishna Prasad is the nephew of Chandra Mohan. He did his graduate studies at Osmania University.

Career
He started his career dubbing the film “Rakasi Nagu” from Kannada (JIDDI) in to Telugu. He did films under Sridevi Movies, Vaishnavi Cinema, and Sridevi Media Entertainments.

He is a life member in the Andhra Pradesh Film Chamber of Commerce and the A.P. Film Producers' Council and has been for the last 30 years, and is also a member in the South Indian Film Chamber of Commerce and the Tamil Film Producers' Council since 2006.

He is a producer and distributor, having experience in the field for more than 35 years and is associated with more than 35 feature films. His recent ventures are Sammohanam, featuring Sudheer Babu and Aditi Rao Hydari, and Yashoda starring Samantha Ruth Prabhu.

Filmography
As a producer

Dubbed Films

As an associate producer

As a line producer

As a distributor
 Rakasi Nagu
 Tulasi Dalam
 Rakshakudu
 Police Story : First Strike
 Mr. Nice Guy (1997 film)
 Who Am I?
 The Accidental Spy
As a Serial Producer

In 2012, he established Sridevi Media Entertainments banner. Under this banner he produced a TV serial Muthyamanta Pasupu in Telugu, telecast on the TV channel ETV Network and successfully completed 250 episodes.

References

External links
 

Film producers from Andhra Pradesh
Nandi Award winners
Filmfare Awards South winners
Telugu film producers
Living people
Businesspeople from Vijayawada
Indian film distributors
Indian television producers
20th-century Indian businesspeople
21st-century Indian businesspeople
1956 births